The 2002–03 Combined Counties Football League season was the 25th in the history of the Combined Counties Football League, a football competition in England.

League table

The league featured 21 clubs from the previous season, along with three new clubs:
AFC Wimbledon, new club formed after Wimbledon F.C. was relocated to Milton Keynes
Frimley Green, joined from the Surrey County Senior League
North Greenford United

League table

External links
 Combined Counties League Official Site

2002-03
2002–03 in English football leagues